Despicable Me 3 is a 2017 American computer-animated comedy film produced by Illumination and distributed by Universal Pictures. It is the sequel to Despicable Me 2 (2013), the third main installment, and the fourth installment overall in the Despicable Me franchise. The film was directed by Pierre Coffin and Kyle Balda, co-directed by production and character designer Eric Guillon, and produced by Chris Meledandri and Janet Healy, from a screenplay written by the writing team of Cinco Paul and Ken Daurio. It stars the voices of Steve Carell, Kristen Wiig, Trey Parker, Coffin, Miranda Cosgrove, Steve Coogan, Jenny Slate, Dana Gaier, Nev Scharrel, and Julie Andrews. In the film, Gru teams up with his long-lost twin brother Dru to stop Balthazar Bratt, a former child actor of the 1980s, from destroying Hollywood, after his show is canceled.

Despicable Me 3 debuted at the Annecy International Animated Film Festival on June 14, 2017, and was theatrically released in the United States on June 30, by Universal Pictures. Despite receiving mixed reviews from critics, the film earned $1.035 billion worldwide, becoming the fourth-highest-grossing film of 2017 and the fourth-highest-grossing animated film of all time during its theatrical run. A sequel, Despicable Me 4, is scheduled for release in July 2024.

Plot

Married Anti-Villain League (AVL) agents Gru and Lucy Wilde attempt to stop former child actor turned supervillain Balthazar Bratt, whose show "Evil Bratt" was canceled when he reached puberty, from stealing the Dumont diamond. Gru recovers the diamond as Bratt escapes. Displeased, Valerie Da Vinci, the newly appointed AVL director, dismisses Gru and Lucy from it.

When Gru and Lucy return home, they tell their adopted daughters Margo, Edith, and Agnes of their dismissal, but assure them they will soon have new jobs. When Gru refuses to return to being a supervillain, and his assistant Dr. Nefario is frozen in carbonite, most of his Minions, led by Mel, abandon him to find new jobs but eventually land in jail.

A butler named Fritz arrives at Gru's home with an invitation from Gru's long-lost twin Dru, who lives in a distant country named Freedonia. The family travels to meet Dru, and are surprised by his immense wealth and massive mansion. Fritz attributes this success to their large pig farming business. Meanwhile, Bratt steals the diamond again, intending to use it to power a giant robot that will destroy Hollywood, as revenge for his show's cancellation. Dru reveals to Gru that their deceased father was a supervillain known as "the Bald Terror", whose villainous activities and technological advances are the real source of the family's wealth. Dru wants Gru to teach him how to become a villain, but Gru refuses to revert to his old ways. While Lucy struggles with her new tasks as a mother, Dru and Gru become closer, especially after joyriding in their father's high-tech vehicle.

Gru and Dru decide to steal the diamond; however, Gru secretly intends to bring it to the AVL to convince Da Vinci to rehire him and Lucy. They narrowly escape with the diamond and are rescued by Lucy. Dru, finding out Gru's true motives, is upset that Gru lied to him about teaching him how to be a villain. In return, Gru insults Dru's incompetence and declares he will leave Freedonia and end their relationship.

Bratt, disguised as Lucy, kidnaps the girls, and once again acquires the diamond. Gru and Dru put aside their differences and pursue him after realizing the deception. With his robot powered by the diamond, Bratt terrorizes Hollywood, covering it in superpowered bubble gum in hopes of lifting the city into outer space. Lucy rescues the girls as Bratt tries to kill Gru with the robot's laser. Dru breaks into the robot and power it down from the inside, nearly dying in the process. Gru engages Bratt in a dance fight before stealing his weaponized keytar to defeat him. The Minions, having escaped jail, reunite with Gru. Dru and Gru also reconcile.

Gru and Lucy are reinstated into the AVL. The newly united family celebrates in Gru's home, and Lucy bonds with the girls and acknowledges them as her daughters. Still wishing to be a supervillain, Dru, along with most of the Minions, steals Gru's rocket-powered aircraft and flies away. Gru and Lucy decide to give them a five-minute head-start before engaging in pursuit.

Voice cast
Steve Carell as Gru, the spy and former supervillain turned Anti-Villain League agent, Margo, Edith, and Agnes' adoptive father, and Lucy's husband.
 Carell also voices Dru, Gru's long-lost twin brother and the girls' adoptive uncle.
Kristen Wiig as Lucy Wilde, an Anti-Villain League agent, Gru's wife and the girls' adoptive mother.
Trey Parker as Balthazar Bratt, a supervillain and former child star who grows up to become obsessed with the character he played in the 1980s and is bent on world domination.
Pierre Coffin as Mel and the other Minions
Coffin also voices a museum director and does additional voices with Kyle Balda.
Miranda Cosgrove as Margo, Gru and Lucy's oldest and clever adopted daughter.
Steve Coogan as Silas Ramsbottom, the director of the Anti-Villain League, who retires at the beginning of the film.
Coogan also voices Fritz, Dru's butler.
Jenny Slate as Valerie Da Vinci, a tyrannical member of the Anti-Villain League who becomes the new AVL director.
Dana Gaier as Edith, Gru and Lucy's middle tomboyish adopted daughter.
Nev Scharrel as Agnes, Gru and Lucy's youngest innocent and immature adopted daughter. She was originally voiced by Elsie Fisher in the first two films.
Julie Andrews as Gru and Dru's mom

Additionally, Andy Nyman voices Clive the robot, Bratt's sidekick., and Adrian Ciscato voices Niko, a boy from Freedonia who falls in love with Margo.

Production

Development
Steve Burke, the NBCUniversal CEO, confirmed in September 2013 that a third film in the Despicable Me series was in development. Cinco Paul and Ken Daurio, the writers of the first two films, announced that they would return to write the screenplay for the film.

Casting
In April 2016, Steve Carell was reported to reprise his role as Gru, and Carell would also voice his twin brother Dru while Trey Parker was cast for the film as Balthazar Bratt. In September 2016, Miranda Cosgrove and Kristen Wiig were reported to reprise their roles as Margo and Lucy Wilde, respectively while Nev Scharrel replaces Elsie Fisher in the role of Agnes.

Music

The soundtrack for Despicable Me 3 was released on June 23, 2017. Pharrell Williams released the new song "Yellow Light" for the soundtrack, which was made available through digital download and streaming.

Marketing and release
The marketing campaign of Despicable Me 3 which included promotions, such as the star ratings being replaced with the Minions during Amazon's "Minion Day", and BuzzFeed's "character takeover" badges. In New York City, 600 taxicabs had the sculpted Minions atop of them, of which had a Minionese greeting. McDonald's released a promotion for a toy set offered in their Happy Meals for the film between May and June 2017. Additional marketing partners for the film included 23 & Me, Chiquita, Ferrero, Kellogg's, Procter & Gamble, Topps, and Yummy Spoonfuls.

Despicable Me 3 debuted at the Annecy International Animated Film Festival on June 14, 2017, followed by a premiere on June 24, at the Shrine Auditorium in Los Angeles. The film was released in the United States on June 30.

Universal Pictures Home Entertainment released Despicable Me 3 for digital download on November 21, and on Blu-ray and DVD on December 5. Physical copies contain behind-the-scenes featurettes, character descriptions, The AVL Database, a Freedonian map, a deleted scene, the sing-along version of "Doowit", the music video for "Yellow Light", Minion mugshots and posters, and a short film, The Secret Life of Kyle.

Reception

Box office
Despicable Me 3 earned $264.6 million in the United States and Canada and $770.2 million in other territories for a worldwide total of $1.034 billion. It was the fourth highest-grossing film of 2017 and the fourth highest-grossing animated film of all time. Deadline Hollywood calculated the film's net profit as $366.2 million, accounting for production budgets, marketing, talent participations, and other costs; box office grosses and home media revenues placed it third on their list of 2017's "Most Valuable Blockbusters".

The film was released with The House and Baby Driver on June 30, 2017. Despicable Me 3 earned $29.2 million on its first day, including $4.1 million from Thursday night previews. The film debuted earning $75.4 million from 4,529 theaters; it was the widest release ever. Its second weekend earnings dropped by 53 percent to $34 million as well as the increased theater count of 4,535, and followed by another $19.4 million the third weekend. Despicable Me 3 completed its theatrical run in the United States and Canada on December 21, 2017.

Worldwide, Despicable Me 3 made $9.9 million in its opening weekend in five markets on June 16, 2017. In its third weekend, the film made $95.6 million in 46 markets. Its top international markets were China ($158.2 million), Japan ($66.2 million), the United Kingdom ($62.7 million), Germany ($43.8 million), and France ($41.4 million).

Critical response
Its critical consensus reads, "Despicable Me 3 should keep fans of the franchise consistently entertained with another round of colorful animation and zany—albeit somewhat scattershot—humor." Metacritic (which uses a weighted average) assigned Despicable Me 3 a score of 49 out of 100 based on 37 critics, indicating "mixed or average reviews". Audiences polled by CinemaScore gave the film an average grade of "A−" on an A+ to F scale, down from the first two films' and Minions (2015) "A".

Alex Welch of IGN gave the film a six out of ten score, saying, "It's not much, but Despicable Me 3 is at least enough for the younger fans of the franchise." Peter Debruge of Variety wrote, "Despicable Me 3 is unwieldy, but it mostly works, as co-directors Pierre Coffin (who also voices the Minions) and Kyle Balda never lose sight of the film's emotional center, packing the rest with as much humor as they can manage. The jokes come so fast and furious, the movie can hardly find room for Heitor Pereira's funky score, and though Pharrell Williams has contributed five new songs to sell soundtracks (including the sweet "There's Something Special"), the movie hardly needs them." Alonso Duralde of TheWrap gave the film a mixed review, saying: "Ultimately, none of these flaws will matter to the throngs of little kids who have made the previous Despicable Me movies (and the superior Minions spin-off) into giant global hits."

Sandy Schaefer for Screen Rant gives the film a three stars out of five saying "Despicable Me 3 offers enough in the way of zany, irreverent entertainment (with a dose of heart) to please steadfast fans of the franchise." Jordan Mintzer for The Hollywood Reporter gave the film a positive review saying "This rather clever, breakneck-paced cartoon gives fans exactly what they want: Like the new nemesis voiced by Trey Parker, it shoots multiple machine-gun bursts of bubblegum at the audience, asking them to chew and enjoy" Peter Travers of Rolling Stone gave the film three stars out of four, saying "Pierre Coffin (who voices the Minions) and co-director Kyle Balda keep the plot spinning merrily. Pharrell Williams contributes five new songs to the mix, including the hummable "There's Something Special." It's no mystery why Illumination's franchise is still something special after three go-rounds—the box-office gross is a whopping $1.5 billion and counting." Leah Greenblatt of Entertainment Weekly gave the film a 'B' grade, saying "What shines through is the visual wit and innate sweetness of the storytelling, and Carell's cackling, cueball-skulled misanthrope a (mostly) reformed scoundrel who can still have his cake, and arsenic too."

Accolades

Sequel

A sequel, Despicable Me 4, is scheduled to be released on July 3, 2024.

Notes

References

External links
 
 
 

2010s American animated films
2010s children's comedy films
2010s English-language films
2017 3D films
2017 comedy films
2017 computer-animated films
3D animated films
American adventure comedy films
American children's animated adventure films
American children's animated comedy films
American computer-animated films
American sequel films
Animated adventure films
Animated films set in Los Angeles
Animated films set in Paris
Despicable Me
Films about twin brothers
Films directed by Pierre Coffin
Films produced by Chris Meledandri
Films produced by Janet Healy
Films scored by Heitor Pereira
Films set in a fictional country
Films with screenplays by Cinco Paul and Ken Daurio
Illumination (company) animated films
Universal Pictures animated films
Universal Pictures films